Acacia hyaloneura is a shrub or tree belonging to the genus Acacia and the subgenus Juliflorae that is native to north eastern Australia.

Description
It has smooth brown coloured bark and glabrous, compressed and angular branchlets that are orange or yellow towards the apex and become red with age. It blooms between December and January and from May to July producing golden flowers. The pendulous and woody seed pods that form after flowering have a linear shape but taper abruptly at each end.

Taxonomy
The species was first formally described by the botanist Leslie Pedley in 1978 as part of the work A revision of Acacia Mill. in Queensland as published in the journal Austrobaileya. It was reclassified by Pedley in 1987 as Racosperma hyaloneurum then transferred back to genus Acacia in 2001.

Distribution
It is endemic to an area in the western part of the top end of the Northern Territory and north-western parts of Queensland.

See also
List of Acacia species

References

hyaloneura
Flora of Queensland
Taxa named by Leslie Pedley
Plants described in 1978